Kyl may refer to:

 John Henry Kyl (1919–2002), U.S. politician
 Jon Kyl (born 1942), former U.S. politician
 Kauppakorkeakoulun Ylioppilaskunnan Laulajat, a men's choir

See also
 
 
 Kyhl
 Kyle (disambiguation)
 Kyll